is a former Japanese football player.

Playing career
Shimada was born in Kanagawa Prefecture on July 10, 1976. He joined his local club Yokohama Marinos from youth team in 1995. On April 15, he debuted against Bellmare Hiratsuka. However he could only play this match until 1996. In 1997, he moved to Regional Leagues club Yokogawa Electric. In 1999, he moved to newly was promoted to J2 League club, Albirex Niigata and he played many matches. In 2000, he moved to Japan Football League club Otsuka Pharmaceutical. He scored 15 goals and was elected  Rookie of the Year award in 2000. However he retired end of 2000 season.

Club statistics

References

External links

1976 births
Living people
Association football people from Kanagawa Prefecture
Japanese footballers
J1 League players
J2 League players
Japan Football League players
Yokohama F. Marinos players
Tokyo Musashino United FC players
Albirex Niigata players
Tokushima Vortis players
Association football forwards